NA-188 Jampur-cum-Rajanpur is a newly-created a constituency for the National Assembly of Pakistan. It mainly comprises the city and tehsil of Rajanpur from the old NA-175. A minor area of the constituency also includes the town of Fazilpur, which was previously included in NA-174.

Election 2018 

General elections are scheduled to be held on 25 July 2018.

See also
NA-187 Jampur
NA-189 Rajanpur

References 

R
R-194